Alessandra Amoroso (born 12 August 1986 in Galatina, Province of Lecce) is an Italian pop/soul singer, songwriter, producer and TV personality. She was the winner of the 2009 edition of the Italian talent show Amici di Maria De Filippi. Since then, she published nine studio albums and two live albums, peaking the Italian Albums Chart eight times. Amoroso has also released successful singles and collaborations, including three number one hits, selling over 2.6 million records in Italy.

Amoroso has collaborated and worked with notable Italian artists, including Loredana Bertè, Elisa, Emma Marrone, J-Ax, Fedez, Tiziano Ferro, Francesco Renga and Fiorella Mannoia.

In 2014, she became the first female Italian artist to win the MTV Europe Music Award for Best European Act, winning overall three MTV Europe Music Awards, seven Wind Music Awards, and received several nominations at the Kids' choice awards and World Music Awards.

She also acted in Io che amo solo te by Marco Ponti in 2015 and she co-hosted with Gianni Morandi the TV program Grazie a tutti in 2009.

Biography and career

Amici di Maria De Filippi and Stupida

Since her youth, Amoroso participated in numerous local competitions, obtaining good results.
In June 2007 she participated in a contest, Fiori di Pesco, singing the song Amor mio, and placed first among the competitors, and was rewarded by Mogol. When she was seventeen, she participated in the auditions for Amici but she failed.

On 5 October 2008, Amoroso passed the audition for the eighth season of Amici di Maria De Filippi, singing the single from Alicia Keys, "If I Ain't Got You". Rudy Zerbi, the chairman of Sony Music Italy, assigned three unpublished singles to Amoroso. She participated in the recording of the compilation disc of the programme, Scialla. "Find a Way" reached the fourth place in the charts, while "Immobile" reached the top position. During the program, the singer distinguished herself thanks to her voice: all the teachers, especially Luca Jurman, recognized a sandblasted timbre. On 25 March 2009, Amoroso was proclaimed winner of Amici di Maria De Filippi, winning the first prize of 200,000 euros. On the same evening, she also received the critics' prize, a scholarship worth 50,000 euros. With this money, Amoroso says she will continue to study with voice teacher Luca Jurman.

After presenting the song during the final of Amici di Maria De Filippi, Alessandra released her first single, Stupida on 27 March 2009. The song got a great success and reached the top position in the ranking of the Federation of the Italian Music Industry (FIMI). On 10 April 2009 Sony Music Italy produced her first EP, Stupida. The album became gold in reservation, because of thirty-five thousand copies being ordered.
On 6 June 2009 in Verona Alessandra receives two Wind Music Award for the sales of Stupida and the compilation Scialla', both certified multiplatinum. From 3 to 8 May 2009 collaborated with the ADMO, an awareness campaign. The experience let her become on 29 December 2009 an official ADMO testimonial. The same day the singer is undergoing tests at the typing to be entered in the register of bone marrow donors.
On 20 June 2009 Alexandra starts, after the zero date in Lecce on 12 April of that year, the Stupida Tour, a tour which goes on throughout the summer in different stadium and theatres in Italy, until 22 September 2009.
In addition to the various stages of the main tour, Alessandra participates in several other tours, including Radio Norba Battiti Live and Trl On Tour, in addition to the tour organized by Amici di Maria de Filippi.

On 21 June she performed at the concert "Amiche per l’abruzzo", organized by Laura Pausini, at the stadium of San Siro in Milan. From 19 June to 22 September, Amoroso pursued a summer tour to promote the Stupida EP on various stages throughout Italy.
On 20 August Amoroso recorded, during the Stupida Tour, her sold-out concert at Arena Ciccio Franco in Reggio Calabria. , Stupida has sold over 200,000 copies in Italy, thus obtaining double platinum.

Senza nuvole

On 12 September 2009 in Rome – during Reggaexplosion – Alessandra duet with Sud Sound System, an Italian band, thus realizing one of her dreams. On 3 October 2009 she participated in O' Scià, a song event organized by Claudio Baglioni. On 31 July 2009, during the Stupida Tour, Sony officially announced the release date of the first album by Alessandra Amoroso, scheduled for 25 September 2009. The title, announced in the following days, was Senza nuvole. Sony also published a version of the album with an extra DVD containing unreleased scenes of Alessandra in the recording studio and some of summer tour's stages. The album was anticipated by the single Estranei a partire da ieri, broadcast on radio from 28 August, with the exception of the RTL 102.5 which broadcast it from 24 August. On 8 October, presented for the first time the album at the Limelight, in Milan. Fans could watch the concert in 37 selected cinemas across Italy who broadcast the event live via satellite in high definition.
The album reached the top position in the ranking of the Federation of the Italian Music Industry, wand held the position for four weeks. 

The second single extracted from the album was the title-track Senza nuvole, which was also the soundtrack to Love 14, a film by Federico Moccia. The videoclip of this song was awarded as Best 2009 video in Rome Clip Film Festival on 10 December 2009. From 8 to 29 November 2009, the singer conducted a variety, called Grazie a tutti, with Gianni Morandi. The collaboration with Gianni was not only about television: Alessandra, in fact, recorded a duet with him, contained in his album Canzoni da non perdere, titled Credo nell'amore.
Since November 2009, Alexandra is promoting Aiutiamo Francesco, a charity initiative for a seven-year-old boy suffering from periventricular leukomalacia.
On 18 November 2009, it was published an unofficial biography of Alessandra for Fanucci Editore, written by Angelo Gregoris and Alessandra Celentano, while in December 2009 Alessandra recorded, along with other artists, including J Ax and Marracash, a Christmas jingle for Radio Deejay, entitled Questo natale.
From 21 January 2010 to 13 March 2010 Alessandra was busy with the winter tour, called Senza Nuvole Live Tour.

On 22 January 2010 a new single was extracted by the album: "Mi sei venuto a cercare tu".
During the third and fourth bet of the Sanremo Festival in 2010, Alessandra crowd the stage at the Ariston Theatre just to sing with Valerio Scanu, the festival winner.
On 2 April 2010 it was extracted the fourth and last single by the album: Arrivi tu, which became one of the hit of summer 2010.
On 8 May 2010 Alessandra participated in TRL Awards 2010, because of the two nominations she received for the category MTV TRL First Lady and My Trl Best Video.
Alessandra also participated in Wind Music Awards 2010, winning an award thank to the sales of Senza nuvole.
From 4 July 2010 to 12 September 2010 Alessandra was busy with the summer tour, called Un'Estate Senza Nuvole Live Tour.
The first album of Alessandra Amoroso sold 210,000 copies, and because of this was certified triple platinum.

Il mondo in un secondo and Cinque passi in più

On 15 July 2010 Sony Music Italy officially announced the second album of Alessandra Amoroso. The title, Il mondo in un secondo, was announced on the official forum of the singer on 29 August 2010. The album release date, 28 September 2010, was announced on 30 August on Sony's official website, consisting of thirteen songs, including two in English produced by Chico Bennett, who has previously worked with artists such as Madonna and Destiny's Child. The album was anticipated from the single "La mia storia con te" on 1 September 2010. Radio started broadcasting the single on 3 September 2010.
The song was very successful, becoming one of the ten most-listened-to tracks in radio. It also reached the second position of the most downloaded singles chart drawn by FIMI. "La mia storia con te" was also chosen as the soundtrack for La figlia di Elisa 2, an Italian film.

Alessandra announced in late September 2011 that she was working about a new project of live about and she confirmed that it was ready just to the end of that year, in Dicembre.
Comes out 4 November 2011 E' vero che vuoi restare, the single who anticipates the release of about a month the live album "Cinque passi in più" containing a cd with 5 new songs and a live cd with the concert that Alessandra kept in Milano on 22 December 2010 at Mediolanum Forum of Assago. A Deluxe Version of the album containing a DVD of the concert and backstage scenes, five postcards, photo of Alessandra and a 36-page-booklet is also available.
On 20 January 2012 the second single from the album was published, titled Ti Aspetto. It's videoclip, filmed in London, was available on March, 14.
In Italy the album sold more of 120,000 copies and it got the double platinum certification.

Amore puro and success in Latin America with Alessandra Amoroso 

In early 2013, Amoroso performed at numerous events and television programs, announcing in the summer the release of her third studio album, produced by Tiziano Ferro. On 20 August 2013 she published the single "Amore Puro", which debuted at position 4 on the FIMI chart. The following 24 September, the album of the same name as the single was released, debuting at No. 1 and being certified double platinum. On 3 May 2014, she performed Italian anthem before the 2013-2014 Coppa Italia final, promoting her concert-event at the Arena di Verona, which was attended by, in order of performance, Emma Marrone, Annalisa, Moreno, Fiorella Mannoia, comedian Giorgio Panariello and Marco Mengoni, which took place on 19 May. At the 2014 MTV Europe Music Awards Amoroso won two awards for Best Italian Act and Best European South Act.

In 22 January 2015, the singer announced the release of the book A mio modo vi amo (In My Way I Love You), which she wrote and which collects various short stories and thoughts written by her fans. Released on 10 March, the book was an incredible commercial success. On 28 July 2015, the single "A tre passi da te" by the italian rgroup Boomdabash, sung as a duet with Amoroso was released. On the same day Amoroso announces that she has two nodules in her vocal cords and on 29 July 2015 she faces surgery, which was later successful.

On 15 September 2015, the singer's first Spanish-language single was published entitled "Grito y no Me Escuchas", a translated version of the song "Urlo e non mi senti". The single is especially successful in Mexico, where it ranks as the most played Spanish-language song on the country's radio stations. In a press release, Sony Music Latin reveals that the Italian artist's first Spanish-language album will be a self-titled and will be released in all physical and digital stores on 18 September 2015, entitled Alessandra Amoroso, produced by José Luis Pagan. After its release, the album peaked at position 31 in Spain and only dropped to #39 after 7 weeks. In November, Alessandra leaves for a promotional tour that touches many countries from Latin America, including Mexico, Argentina and Costa Rica.

Vivere a colori and 10 
On 7 November 2015, she premiered the single "Stupendo fino a qui," during her appearance on the TV program Tú sí que vales. On 11 December 2015 she announced her fourth studio album, titled Vivere a colori, which will be released on 15 January 2016. The album was produced by Michele Canova and Andrea Rigonat, and features numerous writers, including Elisa, Tiromancino, Dario Faini and Tiziano Ferro. L'album debutta alla prima posizione della Italian Albums Chart, being certified three times platinum by FIMI with 150,000 copies sold.  On 26 February 2016 the second single "Comunque andare" was released, certified quadruple platinum. On 17 March 2016, the eponymous single "Vivere a colori" was extracted as the third single, followed on 16 April by the fourth single "Sul ciglio senza far rumore". On 12 May, when she participated in the program E poi c'è Cattelan, she tried to set a new record for the most duets within two minutes (with 19 people). On 20 May came the certification of entry into the Guinness Book of Records. She turns out to be the fifth most listened to female artist and the first most listened to Italian singer on Spotify in 2016.

On 5 October 2018, Alessandra Amoroso published her sixth studio album 10, a title chosen to celebrate the singer's ten years as a solo artist, anticipated by singles "La stessa" and "Trova un modo". In the first week of release, the album was certified gold disc for selling more than 25 000 copies. On 4 January 2019, she released her third single "Dalla tua parte". The following month, she was a guest at the 69th Sanremo Music Festival, receiving a standing ovation from the audience thanks to her rendition of "Io che non vivo (senza te)" with Claudio Baglioni. On 5 March 2019, Amoroso opened her italian tour and published the fourth single "Forza e coraggio". In early June, the single "Mambo salentino", recorded by Boomdabash in collaboration with the singer, was published, peaking at number four of Italian Singles Chart and certified triple platinum.

A new version of "Immobile", titled "Immobile 10+1", was released on 20 December. Then, Amoroso announced she was taking an indefinite break from the music business to devote herself to her private life.

Come back to the stage and Tutto accade 
 
In 2020 Amoroso returned to collaborate with Boomdabash on the single "Karaoke", published on 12 June, becoming her third number one song on Italian Singles Chart and received six platinum certification. On 15 January 2021, the single "Pezzo di cuore" was published, made together with Emma Marrone and included in the collection Best of ME. The song peaked at number two on Italian Singles Chart and received the platinum certification.

On 7 and 8 April, the singles "Piuma" and "Sorriso grande" were released, respectively, presented live during a concert held by the singer in Rome via live streaming. On 3 September, the third single "Tutte le volte" was released and the seventh album Tutto accade, released on 22 October, was confirmed. The album debuted at number two on the Italian Album Charts, earning a gold disc certification by FIMI. The fourth single was "Canzone inutile", released on 12 November 2021.

On 16 May 2022, she released the single "Camera 209", anticipating the show Tutto Accade a San Siro, which will see the singer be the second Italian woman to perform at Milan's San Siro Stadium on 13 July 2022.

Other ventures

Model and advisor 

 Advisor and television testimonial for STAMPS Watches (2013)
 Advisor and testimonial for Motivi (2014)
 Advisor and television testimonial for Swarovski (2016)
 Advisor and television testimonial for Pandora (2018)
 Advisor and television testimonial for OVS (2019)

Philanthropy 
In 2018, Amoroso founded "Big Family Onlus," a nonprofit association to support the singer's humanitarian aid campaigns. The association supports those with leukemia, eating disorders and autism, founded a home for women victims of violence, supported Italian hospitals during the COVID-19 pandemic, and raised funds for refugees from the war in Ukraine in 2022. Amoroso also worked with Save the Children, Caritas, Médecins Sans Frontières, and AIRC Foundation for Cancer Research in Italy.

Amoroso supports LGBT rights in Italy, supporting the DDL Zan in 2021, to extend anti-racism laws to outlaw discrimination and hate crimes against women, gay and transgender people, following a number of attacks in preceding months against LGBT people.

On 21 June 2009, Amoroso performed at the "Amiche per l'Abruzzo", a charity initiative concert created after the L'Aquila earthquake, alongside 102 Italian female singers, including Laura Pausini, Fiorella Mannoia, Gianna Nannini, Elisa, Emma Marrone, Giorgia, Arisa, Carmen Consoli and Raffaella Carrà.

In 2020, the benefit concert event "Una, Nessuna, Centomila" was announced, promoted by the singer herself together with Laura Pausini, Fiorella Mannoia, Gianna Nannini, Elisa, Emma Marrone and Giorgia, to combat gender inequality and violence against women in Italy. The concert, scheduled for 19 September 2020, was postponed to 11 June 2022 due to the covid 19 pandemic.

Musical influences
Alessandra Amoroso has repeatedly stated that her favorite kinds of music are the black, soul, R&B and gospel, which represent the sandblasted timbre of the singer. She cited Anastacia, Beyoncé, Anita Baker as international artists who have most influenced her and Elisa, Mina, Tiziano Ferro among Italian artists.

Luca Jurman, at the entrance of Alessandra in Amici di Maria De Filippi, saying "Alessandra is the new Anita Baker" associated her timbre to that of the renowned R&B singer.

Discography

Studio album

Live Album 

 2011 – Cinque passi in più (ITA: 3× Platinum, 150,000+)
 2011 – 10, io, noi

EPs
2009 – Stupida (ITA: 4× Platinum, 200,000+)

Singles

Collaborations

Music videos

Collaboration

Compilations

DVD
Guest appearance

 2009 – Grazie a tutti – il concerto CD e DVD (CD + DVD) of Gianni Morandi
 2010 – Q.P.G.A. Filmopera (double DVD) of Claudio Baglioni
 2010 – Amiche per l'Abruzzo (double DVD) of various authors (concert's godmother: Laura Pausini, Fiorella Mannoia, Gianna Nannini, Elisa e Giorgia) (enterprise of charity)

Tour
 2009
Stupida tour
2010
Senza Nuvole Live Tour
Un'Estate Senza Nuvole Live Tour
2011
Il mondo in un secondo tour
Il mondo in un secondo summer tour

 Others tour, in Italy, with Alessandra's participation
2009: Amici tour, Radionorba Battiti live tour 2009, TRL – Total Request Live on tour 2009, Grazie a tutti tour of Gianni Morandi, Radio Italia Live Tour 2009, Radio Bruno Live Tour
2010: Radionorba Battiti live tour 2010

Awards and competitions

Sources

External links
 Official website

1986 births
People from the Province of Lecce
Italian pop singers
Living people
Torch singers
Spanish-language singers of Italy
Italian singer-songwriters
21st-century Italian singers
21st-century Italian women singers